Parore Te Awha  (?–1887) was a New Zealand Māori leader. Of Māori descent, he identified with the Ngā Puhi and Te Roroa iwi. He was born in Mangakahia, Northland, New Zealand.

References

1887 deaths
People from the Northland Region
Ngāpuhi people
Te Roroa people
Year of birth unknown